CJWW is a Canadian radio station, airing a country format at 600 AM in Saskatoon, Saskatchewan. The station is owned by Elmer Hildebrand via 629112 Saskatchewan Ltd. (trading as Saskatoon Media Group). It shares studios with sister stations CKBL-FM and CJMK-FM at 219 Robin Crescent (as of June 21, 2021).

Originally launching at 1370 AM on January 12, 1976, it moved to 750 in 1985, and finally to 600 (the former AM location of sister station CFQC radio) in 1995.

When it went on the air, CJWW had an easy listening format. In 1980, the station flipped to its current country format.

References

External links
 Country 600 CJWW
 
 

JWW
JWW
Radio stations established in 1976
1976 establishments in Saskatchewan